BTF may refer to the following:

Back to the Future, film and/or film series.
Bangalore Theological Forum, an academic journal
BTF (finance), French Treasury bills
Baseball Think Factory, website
Berkshire Theatre Festival, arts venue in Massachusetts, United States
Bhindranwala Tigers Force of Khalistan, Sikh militant group
Bhutan Tiger Force
 Bidirectional texture function
Bottesford railway station, Leicestershire, England (station code: BTF)
 Brain Trauma Foundation, American organisation
Brain Tumor Foundation, American charity
 British Tamils Forum
 British Thyroid Foundation
 British Transport Films
 British Triathlon Federation, the national governing body for triathlon, duathlon and multisport in Great Britain.
 blessthefall, a metalcore band
 Skypark Airport, Bountiful, Utah, United States (IATA code: BTF)
 Benzotrifluoride, an alternative name of trifluorotoluene